Kohout (feminine Kohoutová) is a Czech surname, meaning rooster. Notable people with the surname include:

 Aleš Kohout (born 1972), Czech footballer
 Antonín Kohout (1919–2013), Czech cellist
 Eduard Kohout (1889–1976), Czech actor
 Jan Kohout (born 1961), Czech diplomat and politician
 Josef Kohout (1917–1994), Austrian Nazi concentration camp survivor
 Marta Kohoutová (1914–1953), Czechoslovak sprint canoer
 Michal Kohout (born 1996), Czech cyclist
 Milan Kohout (born 1955), Czech–American artist and writer
 Pavel Kohout (born 1928), Czech and Austrian novelist, playwright, and poet
 Pavel Kohout (organist) (born 1976), Czech organist
 Slavka Kohout (born 1932), American figure skating coach
 Zdeněk Kohout (born 1967), Czech bobsledder

See also
 
 
Kohaut
Kohoutek
Kohut
Kahoot

Czech-language surnames
Surnames from nicknames